Melville was a provincial electoral district for the Legislative Assembly of Saskatchewan, Canada. Located in southeastern Saskatchewan, this constituency was created before the 8th Saskatchewan general election in 1934. The Representation Act, 2002 (Saskatchewan) merged this riding with parts of the Saltcoats electoral district to form the new riding of Melville-Saltcoats.

It was the riding of Premier James Garfield Gardiner, and his son James Wilfrid Gardiner.

Members of the Legislative Assembly

Election results

|-

|Conservative
|Elisha Forest Scharf
|align="right"|1,930
|align="right"|22.93%
|align="right"|–

|Farmer-Labour
|Wilfrid Wass
|align="right"|1,504
|align="right"|17.87%
|align="right"|–
|- bgcolor="white"
!align="left" colspan=3|Total
!align="right"|8,417
!align="right"|100.00%
!align="right"|

|-

|- bgcolor="white"
!align="left" colspan=3|Total
!align="right"|Acclamation
!align="right"|

|-

|- bgcolor="white"
!align="left" colspan=3|Total
!align="right"|10,189
!align="right"|100.00%
!align="right"|

|-

|style="width: 130px"|CCF
|William James Arthurs
|align="right"|4,575
|align="right"|50.78%
|align="right"|–

|Prog. Conservative
|Shamus Patrick Regan
|align="right"|821
|align="right"|9.11%
|align="right"|-
|- bgcolor="white"
!align="left" colspan=3|Total
!align="right"|9,010
!align="right"|100.00%
!align="right"|

|-

|CCF
|George T. Webster
|align="right"|4,690
|align="right"|42.61%
|align="right"|-8.17

|- bgcolor="white"
!align="left" colspan=3|Total
!align="right"|11,006
!align="right"|100.00%
!align="right"|

|-

|style="width: 130px"|CCF
|Allan Brown
|align="right"|4,578
|align="right"|46.29%
|align="right"|+3.68

|- bgcolor="white"
!align="left" colspan=3|Total
!align="right"|9,889
!align="right"|100.00%
!align="right"|

|-

|CCF
|Allan Brown
|align="right"|3,808
|align="right"|39.81%
|align="right"|-4.77

|Prog. Conservative
|Gordon C. Peters
|align="right"|189
|align="right"|1.98%
|align="right"|-
|- bgcolor="white"
!align="left" colspan=3|Total
!align="right"|9,565
!align="right"|100.00%
!align="right"|

|-

|CCF
|Joseph Elfenbaum
|align="right"|3,411
|align="right"|38.35%
|align="right"|-1.46

|Prog. Conservative
|Maurice Tallant
|align="right"|881
|align="right"|9.90%
|align="right"|+7.92
|- bgcolor="white"
!align="left" colspan=3|Total
!align="right"|8,895
!align="right"|100.00%
!align="right"|

|-

|CCF
|William Wiwchar
|align="right"|3,229
|align="right"|38.71%
|align="right"|+0.36

|Prog. Conservative
|Douglas A. Ellis
|align="right"|1,627
|align="right"|19.51%
|align="right"|+9.61
|- bgcolor="white"
!align="left" colspan=3|Total
!align="right"|8,341
!align="right"|100.00%
!align="right"|

|-

|style="width: 130px"|NDP
|John Kowalchuk
|align="right"|3,584
|align="right"|45.68%
|align="right"|+6.97

|Prog. Conservative
|Art Pelzer
|align="right"|799
|align="right"|10.18%
|align="right"|-9.33
|- bgcolor="white"
!align="left" colspan=3|Total
!align="right"|7,846
!align="right"|100.00%
!align="right"|

|-

|style="width: 130px"|NDP
|John Kowalchuk
|align="right"|4,184
|align="right"|59.60%
|align="right"|+13.92

|- bgcolor="white"
!align="left" colspan=3|Total
!align="right"|7,020
!align="right"|100.00%
!align="right"|

|-

|style="width: 130px"|NDP
|John Kowalchuk
|align="right"|3,747
|align="right"|45.45%
|align="right"|-14.15

|Prog. Conservative
|Glenn Miller
|align="right"|2,478
|align="right"|30.06%
|align="right"|-

|- bgcolor="white"
!align="left" colspan=3|Total
!align="right"|8,244
!align="right"|100.00%
!align="right"|

|-

|style="width: 130px"|NDP
|John Kowalchuk
|align="right"|4,072
|align="right"|48.26%
|align="right"|+2.81

|Prog. Conservative
|Glenn Miller
|align="right"|3,465
|align="right"|41.06%
|align="right"|+11.00

|- bgcolor="white"
!align="left" colspan=3|Total
!align="right"|8,438
!align="right"|100.00%
!align="right"|

|-

|style="width: 130px"|Prog. Conservative
|Grant Schmidt
|align="right"|4,172
|align="right"|47.57%
|align="right"|+6.51

|NDP
|Pat Krug
|align="right"|3,486
|align="right"|39.75%
|align="right"|-8.51

|- bgcolor="white"
!align="left" colspan=3|Total
!align="right"|8,770
!align="right"|100.00%
!align="right"|

|-

|style="width: 130px"|Prog. Conservative
|Grant Schmidt
|align="right"|4,575
|align="right"|53.46%
|align="right"|+5.89

|NDP
|Matt Stecyk
|align="right"|3,302
|align="right"|38.59%
|align="right"|-1.16

|- bgcolor="white"
!align="left" colspan=3|Total
!align="right"|8,558
!align="right"|100.00%
!align="right"|

|-

|style="width: 130px"|NDP
|Evan Carlson
|align="right"|3,656
|align="right"|45.90%
|align="right"|+7.31

|Prog. Conservative
|Grant Schmidt
|align="right"|3,048
|align="right"|38.26%
|align="right"|-15.20

|- bgcolor="white"
!align="left" colspan=3|Total
!align="right"|7,966
!align="right"|100.00%
!align="right"|

|-

|NDP
|Evan Carlson
|align="right"|2,975
|align="right"|38.07%
|align="right"|-7.83

|Prog. Conservative
|Doug Gattinger
|align="right"|1,566
|align="right"|20.04%
|align="right"|-18.22
|- bgcolor="white"
!align="left" colspan=3|Total
!align="right"|7,815
!align="right"|100.00%
!align="right"|

|-

|NDP
|Michael K. Fisher
|align="right"|2,056
|align="right"|26.91%
|align="right"|-11.16
|- bgcolor="white"
!align="left" colspan=3|Total
!align="right"|7,640
!align="right"|100.00%
!align="right"|

See also
Electoral district (Canada)
List of Saskatchewan provincial electoral districts
List of Saskatchewan general elections
List of political parties in Saskatchewan
Melville, Saskatchewan

References
 Saskatchewan Archives Board – Saskatchewan Election Results By Electoral Division

Melville, Saskatchewan
Former provincial electoral districts of Saskatchewan